Richard Lee Henninger (born January 11, 1948) is a former professional baseball pitcher. He played for the Texas Rangers of Major League Baseball (MLB) in its 1973 season.

A native of Hastings, Nebraska, Henninger attended Hastings High School and graduated in 1966. He went to the University of Missouri and had a standout sophomore year. Henninger was selected with the 16th overall pick in the 1968 June Secondary Phase Draft by the Washington Senators. He joined the Texas Rangers organization and made his MLB debut on September 3, 1973, against the Chicago White Sox. Henninger pitched six games and finished with a 2.74 earned run average with one win. After his baseball career, he moved to Denver and worked in the oil industry.

References

External links
, or Retrosheet
Pelota Binaria (Venezuelan Winter League)

1948 births
Living people
American expatriate baseball players in Mexico
Baseball players from Nebraska
Cardenales de Lara players
American expatriate baseball players in Venezuela
Denver Bears players
Major League Baseball pitchers
Mexican League baseball pitchers
Missouri Tigers baseball players
Oklahoma City 89ers players
People from Hastings, Nebraska
Pittsfield Senators players
Savannah Senators players
Spokane Indians players
Sultanes de Monterrey players
Texas Rangers players
Hastings Senior High School (Nebraska) alumni